The Palang Burapha Party is a political party in Thailand founded in 2011 based in Chonburi Province. The party's key figure is its "chief adviser" Sontaya Kunplome, former minister of tourism under Thaksin Shinawatra, who left the Bhumjaithai Party in 2011 to found the Phalang Chon Party. Formally, the party is chaired by Chao Maneewong. In the 2011 general election, the party won seven seats: one party-list seat and six constituencies. All of the seats won, represent Chonburi Province, Sontaya's home province and Phalang Chon's only stronghold. After the elections, the Phalang Chon Party agreed to participate in a five-party coalition government, dominated by the Pheu Thai Party and led by Yingluck Shinawatra. Sontaya's wife Sukumol Kunplome was given the post of culture minister in Yingluck's cabinet.

Later, on Tuesday, January 24, 2023, the Palang Chon Party held its 1/2023 general meeting to elect a new party executive committee to replace the old one whose term expired.  Along with amending the party's regulations, changing the name of the party to Palang Burapha Party including ideology and party policies.

External links
old Official website (in Thai)

References

Political parties in Thailand
Political parties established in 2011
2011 establishments in Thailand